President Carlos P. Garcia, officially the Municipality of President Carlos P. Garcia and alternatively known as Pitogo, is a 4th class municipality in the province of Bohol, Philippines. According to the 2020 census, it has a population of 23,625 people.

It primarily consists of Lapinig Island along with a few surrounding islets. According to the 2020 census, it has a population of 23,625.

The town of President Carlos P. Garcia (Pitogo), Bohol celebrates its feast on January 10, to honor the town patron the Holy Child.

History

In the early part of the 19th century, the place was part of the municipality of Ubay, known as Lapinig Grande and subdivided into six barrios: Pitogo, Aguining, Basiao, Bonbonon, Gaus, and Tugas.

Congressman Teodoro Galagar of the 3rd Congressional District of the province of Bohol, initiated the formation of Lapining Grande into a town. Aguining, Pitogo, and Bonbonon were the barangays bidding for township. On 21 June 1969, RA 5864 was approved creating Pitogo as the 46th town of the province of Bohol with 23 regular barangays. Eight years later on 27 October 1977, it was renamed by Presidential Decree 1228 in honour of President Carlos P. Garcia, who was born in nearby Talibon.

Geography

Barangays

President Carlos P. Garcia comprises 23 barangays:

List of Islands

Bantigue
Bogo
Bonoon
Budlaan
Butan
Gaus
Lapinig Pequeño
Lapinig Pequeño II
Lapinig Grande
Pamasuan
Popoo
Saguise
Tilmobo

Climate

Demographics

Economy

Education

See also

List of renamed cities and municipalities in the Philippines

References

External links
 [ Philippine Standard Geographic Code]
Pres. Carlos P. Garcia, Bohol

Municipalities of Bohol
Island municipalities in the Philippines